A wall plan is a drawing which consists of complete details with dimensions (with an accuracy of an inch) about all four sides and ceiling of each and every room in a building. It is drawn with the help of a floor plan as the basic input.

The main contents in a Wall Plan are:
Electrical points (like Switch Board Position, Light Position, etc.)
Doors and windows (like position of doors and windows in the wall, etc.)
Wardrobes and shelves (like size and position, etc.)
Plumbing points (like faucet position, toilet position, sink position, etc.)
Electronic points (like cable television points, telephone points, LAN points, etc.)
Household items (like where to put where)
Aesthetic items (like wall painting, clock, mirror, photos, etc.)
Kitchen items (like positioning of microwave oven, water purifier, chimney, etc.)

References
 FAQs on Wall Plan

Technical drawing
Building